Barwala is a village in the Nagaur district of Rajasthan, India. It is located in the Makrana tehsil. The nearest city is Kuchaman City (8 km).

According to the 2011 census of India, the village's has 479 households with 2,762 people.

References 

Villages in Nagaur district